Trinity Hospital is a historic former hospital, now a mixed-used commercial and residential building, at 20th and Main Streets in Little Rock, Arkansas.  It is a two-story brick structure, roughly square in shape with a central courtyard and an ell projecting from its southern side.  It was designed by local architect Maximilian F. Mayer and built in 1924, with restrained Classical Revival elements.  The building is historically notable as the first place in Arkansas where the now-common health maintenance organization methods of funding and delivering health care were implemented.  The building now houses the offices of a non-profit and low-income housing.

The building was listed on the National Register of Historic Places in 1998.

See also
National Register of Historic Places listings in Little Rock, Arkansas

References

Hospital buildings on the National Register of Historic Places in Arkansas
Neoclassical architecture in Arkansas
Hospital buildings completed in 1931
Buildings and structures in Little Rock, Arkansas
National Register of Historic Places in Little Rock, Arkansas
Historic district contributing properties in Arkansas